Alfred Charles Abrew (born July 3, 1974) is a former college and professional American football quarterback who played in the Canadian Football League and Arena Football League.

High school
Abrew attended De La Salle of Concord and played and threw balls to future NFL widereciever Amani Toomer.

College career

San Jose State
On August 21, 1994, head coach John Ralston named Abrew the starting quarterback. Alli would replace Jeff Garcia, who graduated that year. Alli started the 1994 season but was replaced in the second week by Carl Dean against USC.

Cal Poly-SLO
Alli transferred to Cal Poly-San Luis Obispo in 1996.

Pro career
Abrew was signed by the Saskatchewan Roughriders of the Canadian Football League in 1999, where he played in two games. In 1999, Alli was also a member of the Calgary Stampeders until being released on June 28, 1999.

In 2000, Alli was a member of the Tampa Bay Storm of the Arena Football League.

References

1974 births
Calgary Stampeders players
Tampa Bay Storm players
Players of American football from California
American football quarterbacks
Canadian football quarterbacks
De La Salle High School (Concord, California) alumni
San Jose State Spartans football players
Living people
Cal Poly Mustangs football players
Saskatchewan Roughriders players
Players of Canadian football from California